The Cathedral of the Immaculate Conception in Fort Wayne, Indiana, is the primary cathedral of the Roman Catholic Diocese of Fort Wayne-South Bend, headed by Most Rev. Kevin Carl Rhoades.  The parish was established in 1836, making it the oldest in Fort Wayne.  The church was erected in 1860.

History
In 1836, Father Louis Mueller was appointed the first resident pastor of the Fort Wayne Territory in the Vincennes Diocese. Mueller began construction on a small log church.

Father Julian Benoit became pastor in 1840. He paid off the debt and purchased the remaining portion of the square, initially for use as a cemetery. In 1849, the German portion of St. Augustine's parish built St. Mary Church (not the present-day St. Mary Church in Fort Wayne), the first German-speaking congregation in Fort Wayne. 

The parish rectory was built in 1854. 
In 1857, the Diocese of Fort Wayne was erected. Bishop John Luers designated St. Augustine's as his cathedral, while at the same time making plans for a larger, more permanent church. St. Augustine's was destroyed by fire in 1859.

The cornerstone for the new cathedral was laid on Trinity Sunday 1859. Rev. Benoit who designed it, named it the Cathedral of the Immaculate Conception, in honor of the Blessed Virgin.

Benoit was the primary fundraiser, making trips to New Orleans and France. Much of the costs he covered himself. The cathedral was dedicated on the feast of the Immaculate Conception, December 8, 1860.

In 1901, the Bishop's house and chancery was erected; paid for by the sale of a farm in Jasper County.

Architecture
The large sanctuary window of Mary was made in Benoit's home country of France and installed in the summer of 1861. The brass candlesticks with the figures of the Apostles were also from France. The crucifix and altar stone were salvaged from St. Augustine Church.

In 1896, the Cathedral underwent a thorough renovation, supervised by Msgr. Joseph H. Brammer. Twelve stained-glass windows from the Royal Bavarian Art Institute, in Munich depict scenes from the Life of Mary.   The wood-carved Stations of the Cross are also from Germany.

Burials
 Msgr. Julian Benoit (†January 26, 1885)
 Bishop John Henry Luers (†June 29, 1871)
 Bishop Joseph Dwenger (†January 22, 1893)
 Bishop Herman Joseph Alerding (†December 6, 1924)

Present day 
The Cathedral building still stands today, maintained through various renovations over the decades, the most recent by Schenkel and Sons, Inc.

The Cathedral grounds, called the Cathedral Square, includes the Chancery of the Diocese of Fort Wayne-South Bend, MacDougal Chapel, Cathedral Center for C.C.D. classes (formerly the Cathedral Boys School), and the Rectory (the priests' residence), and the grave of the last Miami Indians chief, Joseph Richardville. Recently, the Cathedral Museum housed in the basement of MacDougal Chapel and diocesan offices located in the Cathedral Center were moved to a new location a few blocks north of Cathedral Square.

It was listed on the National Register of Historic Places in 1980.

Current pastoral staff
Rector - Fr. Jacob D. Runyon
Associate pastors - Fr. Peter Dee De and Fr. Wimal Jayasuria

See also
List of Catholic cathedrals in the United States
Roman Catholic Marian churches
List of tallest buildings in Fort Wayne

References

External links
 
 
 Roman Catholic Diocese of Fort Wayne-South Bend Official Site
 LaBarbera, Today's Catholic, December 1, 2010 -extensive list of renovations
 video re stained glass windows
 numerous photographs of buildings around Cathedral Square, p. 21 et seq

Immaculate Conception, Fort Wayne
Religious organizations established in 1836
National Register of Historic Places in Fort Wayne, Indiana
Churches on the National Register of Historic Places in Indiana
Culture of Fort Wayne, Indiana
Roman Catholic churches in Fort Wayne, Indiana
Roman Catholic churches completed in 1859
19th-century Roman Catholic church buildings in the United States
Gothic Revival church buildings in Indiana
1836 establishments in Indiana